The voiced velar approximant is a type of consonantal sound, used in some spoken languages.

The consonant is not present in English, but approximates to the sound of a 'g' with the throat kept open, or like making a 'w' sound without the lips touching.

In some languages, such as Spanish, the voiced velar approximant appears as an allophone of  – see below.

Features
Features of the voiced velar approximant:

 The most common type of this approximant is glide or semivowel. The term semivowel emphasizes that, although the sound is vocalic in nature, it is not 'syllabic' (it does not form the nucleus of a syllable). For a description of the approximant consonant variant used e.g. in Spanish, see below.

Occurrence 
{| class="wikitable"
! colspan="2" | Language !! Word !! IPA !! Meaning !! Notes
|-
|-
|-
| Extremaduran ||  || ||
|-
| Leonese ||  || ||
|-
| Mirandese ||  || ||
|-
See Catalan phonology
|-
| colspan="2" | Cherokee || ᏩᏥ  ||  || 'watch' || Found only in the Western dialect. Its equivalent in other dialects is [w]. Also represented by Ꮺ, Ꮻ, Ꮼ, Ꮽ, and Ꮾ
|-
| Danish || Older speakers ||  ||  || 'tallow' || Approximant consonant unspecified for rounding. Still used by some older speakers in high register, much more commonly than a fricative . See Danish phonology
|-
| Dutch || Western East Flemish || || || || Approximant consonant unspecified for rounding. Corresponds to a fricative  in other dialects.
|-
See French phonology
|-
See Galician phonology
|-
|-
| rowspan="2" | Guarani 
| ||  ||  || 'near, close to' || Contrasts with 
|-
|Ñandewa Paulista-Paranaense
|
|
|'I cut'
|-
|-
|-
| colspan="2" | Icelandic ||  ||  || 'saga' || Approximant consonant unspecified for rounding. See Icelandic phonology
|-
| colspan="2" | Irish ||  ||  || 'nine' || Occurs only between broad consonants and front vowels. See Irish phonology
|-
| colspan="2" | Korean ||  /  ||  || 'doctor' || Occurs only before . See Korean phonology
|-
|-
|-
See Spanish phonology
|-
See Swedish phonology
|-
See Tagalog phonology
|-
| colspan="2" | Tiwi ||  ||  || 'we (inclusive)' ||
|-
| colspan="2" | Venetian ||  ||  || 'gondola' || See Venetian language
|-
|Vietnamese
|Southern
|gà|
|'chicken'
Variant is in complementary distribution before open vowels.
|}

Pre-velar

 Voiced velar bunched approximant 

Some languages have a velar approximant that is produced with the body of the tongue bunched up at the velum and simultaneous pharyngealization. This gives rise to a type of retroflex resonance resembling .

This captures pharyngealization (uncommon in velar approximants) but not bunching of the tongue, which can be transcribed by adding a superscript retroflex approximant: ,  (see ).

In Dutch, this type of r is called   'Gooi r'. It is named after het Gooi, a region of the Netherlands where Hilversum (the main centre for television and radio broadcasting) is located.

Features
Features of the voiced velar bunched approximant:

 The body of the tongue is bunched up at the velum, rather than just approaching it as it is the case with the prototypical velar approximant.

Occurrence

Some languages have a voiced velar approximant that is unspecified for rounding, and therefore cannot be considered the semivocalic equivalent of either  or its rounded counterpart .

Eugenio Martínez Celdrán describes the voiced velar approximant consonant as follows:

There is a parallel problem with transcribing the palatal approximant.

The symbol  may not display properly in all browsers. In that case,  should be substituted. In broader transcriptions, the lowering diacritic may be omitted altogether, so that the symbol is rendered , i.e. as if it represented the corresponding fricative.

See also
 Index of phonetics articles

Notes

References

 
 
 
 
 
 
 
 .
.

External links
 

Velar consonants
Pulmonic consonants
Voiced oral consonants
Central consonants